Stimulopalpus japonicus is a species of tropical barklouse in the family Amphientomidae. It is found in North America and Southern Asia.

References

Troctomorpha
Articles created by Qbugbot
Insects described in 1906